Astragalus bidentatus is a species of plant in the family Fabaceae. It is found only in Ecuador in two locations in the south above the timberline in the Azuay and Cañar provinces. Its natural habitat is subtropical or tropical high-altitude grassland. No specimens have been taken since 1945 and none are contained in museums.

References

bidentatus
Flora of Ecuador
Endangered plants
Taxonomy articles created by Polbot